Jean-Pierre Vigier (born September 11, 1976) is a Canadian former professional ice hockey right winger. He played in the National Hockey League (NHL) for the Atlanta Thrashers and in Switzerland's National League A for Genève-Servette HC and SC Bern between 2000 and 2012. Vigier served as captain for SC Bern during away games.

Playing career
Vigier spent four seasons at Northern Michigan University before signing as a free-agent with the Atlanta Thrashers of the National Hockey League. He began his professorial career in the International Hockey League with the Orlando Solar Bears. Vigier played parts of two season with the Solar Bears helping them to win the Turner Cup in 2001. He also made his NHL debut during the 2000–01 season, one of only two games he played at the NHL level that year. Following the 2000–01 season Vigier joined the Chicago Wolves of the American Hockey League (AHL). While with the Wolves he helped them win the Calder Cup in 2002, scoring 14 points in 21 play-off games. He split time between the Wolves and Thrashers for the next two seasons before becoming an NHL regular during the 2003–04 season. Vigier returned to the AHL for the 2004–05 season following the news that the 2004–05 NHL season was canceled due to the labor dispute. He went on to score 29 goals and 70 points while posting a career best plus-26, the successful season earned him AHL Second All-Star Team honors. He again helped the Wolves to the Calder Cup finals, registering 11 points in 18 play-off games. However, the Wolves were swept in the Calder Cup finals by the Philadelphia Phantoms. 

Vigier returned to the NHL following the lockout but was limited to only 41 games due to a broken foot and a knee injury. He was re-signed by the Thrashers to a one-year deal in the off-season. He played in 72 games during 2006–07 season scoring 5 goals and 13 points. In 2007, he signed with Genève-Servette HC in Switzerland where he played for two seasons, scoring a total of 67 points. He joined National League A rival SC Bern on 18 June 2009.

International career
Vigier has represented Canada three times as a member of Team Canada at the 2007, 2008, and 2009 Spengler Cup tournaments. Winning the Spengler Cup in 2007.

Career statistics

Regular season and playoffs

Awards and honours

References

External links

1976 births
Living people
Atlanta Thrashers players
Canadian ice hockey right wingers
Chicago Wolves players
Franco-Manitoban people
Genève-Servette HC players
Ice hockey people from Manitoba
Northern Michigan Wildcats men's ice hockey players
Orlando Solar Bears (IHL) players
People from Central Plains Region, Manitoba
Portage Terriers players
SC Bern players
Undrafted National Hockey League players
Canadian expatriate ice hockey players in Switzerland